Hasaitic is an Ancient North Arabian dialect attested in inscriptions in the Eastern Province of Saudi Arabia at Thaj, Hinna, Qatif, Ras Tanura, Abqaiq in the al-Hasa region, Ayn Jawan, Mileiha and at Uruk.
It is written in the Monumental South Arabian script and dates from the 5th to 2nd centuries BC.

Notes

External links
http://www.uaeinteract.com/history/e_walk/con_3/con3_21.asp 

Arabic languages
History of Saudi Arabia
Ancient North Arabian
Rock art in Saudi Arabia